The 1983–84 A Group was the 36th season of the A Football Group, the top Bulgarian professional league for association football clubs, since its establishment in 1948.

Overview
It was contested by 16 teams, and Levski Sofia won the championship. In addition, Levski became the first Bulgarian club to win a treble this season.

League standings

Results

Champions
Levski Sofia

Top scorers

References
Bulgaria - List of final tables (RSSSF)

First Professional Football League (Bulgaria) seasons
Bulgaria
1983–84 in Bulgarian football